Bayda, or Elbeida ( or) (also spelt az-Zāwiyat al-Bayḍāʾ, Zāwiyat al-Bayḑā’, Beida and El Beida; known as Beda Littoria under Italian colonial rule), is a commercial and industrial city in eastern Libya. It is located in northern Cyrenaica. With a population of 250,000 people, Bayda is the 4th-largest city in Libya (after Tripoli, Benghazi and Misrata). It is the capital city of the Jabal al Akhdar district.

History
Bayda's history stretches back to classical antiquity, when it was known as Balagrae. The 2000-year-old ruins of the ancient Greek colony of Cyrene are located nearby in Shahat.

One of the greatest attractions in the city is the tomb of a famous companion (sahabah) of the Islamic prophet Muhammad, Ruwaifi bin Thabit al-Ansari. For that reason, the city was known as Sidi Rafaa after him. After the arrival of Muhammad ibn Ali as-Senussi in the area in the 19th century, and the construction of a zāwiyah, the city was renamed az-Zāwiyat al-Bayḍāʾ.

The modern city was built in the 1950s. It was originally intended to be the new capital of Libya and most of the necessary government buildings were constructed there. Eventually, the plan to move the capital from Tripoli to Bayḍāʾ was dropped.

During the First Libyan Civil War, the city was the first to fall to Anti-Gaddafi forces after the Battle of Bayda.

Name
Bayḍāʾ means "white" in Arabic. The naming of the city is connected with the Senussi movement, which had dedicated zāwiyahs in the town to educate local people in fiqh, Quranic memorisation to the young, as well as local and tribal conflict resolution, as was customary at the time. The town became known as az-Zāwiyat al-Bayḍāʾ ("the White Monastery") because of the white painted zāwiyah, which lies on top of a high hill and was clearly visible from a distance. Within time, the word zāwiyah was dropped and the city became known simply as al-Bayḍāʾ.

When the settlement was first founded by the Greeks, it was known as Balagrae. During Fascist Italian rule, the city was known as Beda Littoria. During monarchy, the zāwiyah at Bayḍāʾ was considered a focal point for the Senussi movement, and in addition to the zāwiyah, the city was also the political capital and seat of government of the Kingdom of Libya until the 1969 Libyan coup d'état. The zāwiyah still exists, but it is in a neglected state and sits near Omar Al-Mukhtar University at the western entrance to the city.

Geography and natural history

The city is famous for the valleys and forests nearby, which are not found in the other cities of the 'Green Mountains'—Akhdar Mountains. It is named the "Green Mountains" because they are covered by dense forests and woodlands, of which the best known are the Hamri, Alpellnj, and Belaid forests.

Native habitat
The Akhdar mountain range lies within the Mediterranean dry woodlands and steppe ecoregion. The region has many native plants closely related to those found in similar Greek, Italian, and Spanish coastal mountains and forests. There are about 1,800 species of Mediterranean forests, woodlands, and scrub trees, plants, and flowers. The forests are characterized by many species of oak, juniper, pine, carob, cypress, hawthorn, Luffa aegyptiaca, and olives. There is a network of natural springs in most parts of the mountains, which makes them one of the most fertile areas of coastal Maghreb. The forested areas and springs provide habitat supportive of a diversity of birds and wildlife.

Bayda is famous for the neighboring locale of Susa, a seaside resort on the Mediterranean Sea.

Agriculture
Cultivated plants include many fruit trees, including apples, grapes, nuts, and other fruits estimated at about four million trees, as well as many medicinal and herbal plants, such as thyme, wandering herb Alkhalap, and rosemary. In the past the mountains probably also had the Silphium plant, which was treasured in antiquity but is now believed to be extinct. Honey is also found in this region, due to the abundance of herbs. Bozharh is a center for the production of honey, for which Jabal al Akhdar is famous. The finest honey comes from bees which feed on the thyme and lotus plants. Honey is also extracted from the chammari or strawberry plant, Arbutus unedo, which blooms in the months of December and January. Honey-murr from the cove region has proved to be useful for the treatment of liver diseases, such as diabetes.

Climate
The altitude added to the northern location sustains the nival precipitation (even if hardly accumulates), different from other near coastal areas.

Economy
Bayda is one of the major cities in eastern Libya, and one of its major economic centers. It is also the industrial and commercial center in Libya. The major manufactured goods include food products, fertilizers and agricultural products, food processing, and imported goods, and produce from villages near the city in the Akhdar region, including cereals, dates, olives, wool, and meat. Bayda also has one of the most important markets of vegetables and fruits in Libya, because of the naturally fertile lands.

Financing is also important, and the city's National Commercial Bank is the second largest bank in Libya. It also has a number of other large banks, including the Office of the Central Bank of Libya in the city center. There is also the Agricultural Research Centre and the main animal and large national firms, such as Brega Oil Marketing Company and Gulf Oil, are important to the city's economy. Coupled with an increase in consumer prices, is an increase in the importance of the retail sector in the economy of the city. In recent years, international companies such as United Colors of Benetton, H & M, and Nike, have opened in Bayda.

Tourism
Tourism as an industry is still in the very early stages in Libya. Bayda is an important tourist city in Libya, a base to explore the nearby tourist areas such as the Ancient Greece ruins of Cyrene and Apollonia, and Libyan Desert trips south into Kufra. The village Balagrae contains several large hotels, due to the tourist population.

Demographics
As with other cities in Libya, there is a reasonable amount of ethnic diversity in Bayda. The people of eastern Libya, Bayda included, have in recent centuries been of predominantly Arab descent. The earliest inhabitants were Berber peoples, and from the 7th century BCE until the 7th century CE, the main ethnic group was Greek. In recent times, there has been an influx of African immigrants into Bayda. The city also hosts many Egyptian immigrants. A small Greek community is also present. The Greek island of Crete is a short distance from Bayda, and many modern families in the city bear Cretan surnames.

The majority of Libyans in Bayda are of Arab, Berber and Greek descendants century, historically controlled a section of Libya. Bayda and its surrounding areas were controlled by the Barasa clan. In modern times, a large number of Libyans from different parts of the country have moved into the city.

Education

Education in Bayda, as is the case throughout Libya, is compulsory and free. Compulsory education continues up until ninth grade. There are many public primary and secondary schools throughout the city, as well as some private and international school and others. Omar Al-Mukhtar University education is also free for all Libyan citizens in Bayda. It holds the country's second largest university, the former Al-Jami'a al-Libiya.

Omar Al-Mukhtar University is the second university established in the country, and the first Islamic university, but after the Revolution of 1960, it was changed to the University of Agriculture, and then to a regular university. It now includes 14 colleges in several cities, such as Tobruq and Derna, Libya.

Religion
The predominant religion in Bayda is Islam. Almost all of the city's inhabitants are Sunni Muslims. During Islamic holidays such as Ramadan, most abstain from food; restaurants are usually empty during the day, with the exception of some expatriates and tourists. Alcohol is banned by law in Bayda and throughout Libya in accordance with Islamic principles. The conservative Islamic nature of Bayda creates a strong sense of family life in the city: almost all teenagers and young adults live at home until they marry. Many in Bayda adhere to the traditional Maliki school of religious law. In recent years however, some people are beginning to practice schools of thought popular in Saudi Arabia such as Salafism, with an increase in the number of literalist-inclined Islamic television channels. It is not uncommon, therefore, to see women wearing black niqabs and men with full beards.

There are many mosques throughout the city; the oldest and best known is the Mosque Ruwayfi bin Thabit Al-Ansari; the oldest mosques are located in and around the medina. There is also a small foreign Christian community in the city: the Franciscan-run Maria Immacolata Parish Church serves Bayda's Catholic community of roughly 4000, as well as a Protestant church belonging to the Church of Christ.

Sports
Bayda has some of the best sports facilities in the country. The city has various sporting centres of different standards, such as football stadiums, as well as several other public and private facilities.
Football is the most popular sport in Bayda, and one of the country's most successful football clubs, Alakhdhar, is based in the city.

The largest sporting centre in Bayda is the Medina al-Riyadhia (Sports City). The complex is situated just north of the city centre, and houses the Al Bayda Stadium and athletics stadium, and the Slayman al Tharrat basketball stadium. Several matches of the 2009 FIBA Africa Championship were hosted at the arena.

Judo and taekwondo are popular men's sports in Bayda. In recent times, rugby sevens has seen great success, with three clubs to its name. Gyms have also become more popular in the city in recent years, because of a greater concern for healthy living amongst Libyans.

Transportation

Road network
Bayda is on the historic Libyan Coastal Highway. The local road network is generally well designed. An efficient system of highways, flyovers, ringroads and underpasses serve the city, and allow for the transport of goods and vehicles. The roads are not always well-maintained however, and often have incorrect, poorly visible or no road markings, as well as potholes in some roads and inner city streets. In recent years, a rapid increase in car ownership has meant that traffic jams, lack of parking spaces and overcrowding are also common, especially on smaller streets. Road accidents are also on the rise because of the increase in vehicles and the subsequent lax attention given by authorities to dangerous driving.

Public transit
There is no systematic public transport system in Bayda, despite the city's size and significance. A popular system of microbuses has developed in recent years and covers many areas of the city, they run on fixed routes and passengers embark and disembark anywhere on the route. There are also international services to Cairo and Alexandria.

Railway
, earthworks are underway in the city for a rail network which will traverse northern Libya. Russian Railways is responsible for the three-year contract. In the future, a rail link may be built to both Tunisia and Egypt, forming a North African coastal rail network.

Airports
The Al Abraq International Airport serves national and international flights.

Twin towns and sister cities
Bayda is twinned with:

References

External links

 
Cyrenaica
Populated places in Jabal al Akhdar
Barbary Wars
Baladiyat of Libya